The Women's 200 metre individual medley competition at the 2017 Summer Universiade was held on 22 and 23 August 2017.

Records
Prior to the competition, the existing world and Universiade records were as follows.

The following new records were set during this competition.

Results

Heats 
The heats were held on 22 August at 09:18.

Semifinals
The semifinals were held on 22 August at 19:32.

Semifinal 1

Semifinal 2

Final 
The final was held on 23 August at 19:22.

References 

Women's 200 metre individual medley